Chadron Formation is a rock formation in North Dakota, South Dakota, northwestern Nebraska, and eastern Wyoming. It is named after the town of Chadron, Nebraska. It was mapped out by Carl Vondra in the 1950s.

References

Paleogene geology of North Dakota
Paleogene geology of South Dakota
Paleogene Colorado
Paleogene geology of Nebraska
Paleogene geology of Wyoming